Vigmostad is a former municipality that was located in the old Vest-Agder county in Norway. The  municipality existed from 1911 until its dissolution in 1964.  The old municipality roughly covered part of the present-day municipality of Lindesnes in Agder county.  The administrative centre was the village of Vigmostad where Vigmostad Church is located.

History
The municipality of Vigmostad was established on 1 January 1911, when the old municipality of Nord-Audnedal was divided into Vigmostad (population: 923) and Konsmo (population: 782). During the 1960s, there were many municipal mergers across Norway due to the work of the Schei Committee. On 1 January 1964, Vigmostad municipality was dissolved, and its area was merged with the neighboring municipalities of Sør-Audnedal and Spangereid to create the new municipality of Lindesnes. Prior to the merger, Vigmostad had a population of 589.

Name
The municipality (originally the parish) is named after the old Vigmostad farm, since that is the location of Vigmostad Church.

Government
All municipalities in Norway, including Vigmostad, are responsible for primary education (through 10th grade), outpatient health services, senior citizen services, unemployment and other social services, zoning, economic development, and municipal roads.  The municipality was governed by a municipal council of elected representatives, which in turn elected a mayor.

Municipal council
The municipal council  of Vigmostad was made up of representatives that were elected to four year terms.  The party breakdown of the final municipal council was as follows:

See also
List of former municipalities of Norway

References

Lindesnes
Former municipalities of Norway
1911 establishments in Norway
1964 disestablishments in Norway